The National Panasonic Series was an Australian motor racing competition for Formula Pacific cars. The series, which was sponsored by National Panasonic, was contested in 1981 and 1982.

Series winners

References

Formula racing series
National Panasonic Series